The 2011 Vietnamese National Football First League season was the 17th season of Vietnam's professional football league and began in January 2011 and finish in August 2011.

Teams

Stadia and locations

League table

References

External links 
 Vietnam Football Federation

Second level Vietnamese football league seasons
2
Viet
Viet